Klaus-Peter Göpfert (born 22 October 1948 in Coburg) is a German former Greco-Roman wrestler who competed in the 1972 Summer Olympics and in the 1976 Summer Olympics.

References

External links
 

1948 births
Living people
Olympic wrestlers of East Germany
Wrestlers at the 1972 Summer Olympics
Wrestlers at the 1976 Summer Olympics
German male sport wrestlers
People from Coburg
Sportspeople from Upper Franconia